State Road 263 (NM 263) is a  state highway in the US state of New Mexico. NM 263's southern terminus is at NM 47 south of Los Lunas, and the northern terminus is at NM 6 in Los Lunas.

Major intersections

See also

References

263
Transportation in Valencia County, New Mexico